"One Man, One Woman" is a song by ABBA, released on their 1977 album ABBA: The Album. It is that album's third track after "Eagle" and "Take a Chance on Me". Composed by Benny Andersson and Björn Ulvaeus, it has appeared on several compilation albums over the years, such as 1998's Love Stories and 2012's The Essential Collection.

Synopsis
The song is about a couple (made up of the titular "man" and "woman") trying to save their marriage.

Composition

Anni-Frid Lyngstad sang the lead vocals. The instruments used in the song are piano, synths, guitar and strings. The piano is used to add a colourful countermelody to the vocal pauses in the chorus, a similar technique to the "descending double-octave riff" used in "Dancing Queen." The synth is used in a "chord-per-bar" fashion throughout the verses, and strings take over in the chorus.

Analysis
Abba: Let the Music Speak describes the song as "one of ABBA's most introspective portraits of the fragility of human relationships", adding that it is engulfed by a "genuinely fatalistic quality". It says that Frida's lead vocal is filled with "urgency and inner suffering...insecurity and self-doubt", filling the song with "unsettling realism". Both her performance and the musical progressions of the song illustrate an unsureness and lack of faith.

Critical reception
The Sydney Morning Herald described the song as a "big-treatment ballad". Soon after the album was released, The Boston Globe described it as "the most striking of the new songs".

References

ABBA songs
1977 songs
1970s ballads
Music videos directed by Lasse Hallström
Pop ballads
Songs about marriage